I Cry For You is the second studio album by Johnnie Ray, released on Columbia Records, after his self-titled debut album. It was released in the United States in 1955 as a 10" LP. It would also receive a release in Australia by Coronet in 1957. The album's Columbia Records catalogue number is CL 2510. The album was released as part of the label's House Party series.

Track listing

Personnel
Johnnie Ray - vocals

References

1955 albums
Johnnie Ray albums
Columbia Records albums